The Rotunda by the Sea is an art installation by sculptor Alejandro Colunga along Puerto Vallarta's Malecón, in the Mexican state of Jalisco. Unveiled in 1996, the work has eight bronze thrones arranged in a circle.

See also

 1996 in art

References

External links
 

1996 establishments in Mexico
1996 sculptures
Bronze sculptures in Mexico
Centro, Puerto Vallarta
Outdoor sculptures in Puerto Vallarta